FANdom Con was an annual three-day multigenre convention held during November at the Emerald Coast Convention Center in Fort Walton Beach, Florida.

Programming
The convention typically offered card game tournaments, concerts, cosplay contest, masquerade ball, panels, rave, vendors, videogame tournaments, and workshops. FANdom Con during the 2015 convention held a blood drive.

History
FANdom Con was organized due to the lack of an anime convention in the Pensacola, Florida area. University of West Florida students decided to form a student organization, named Con-Quest, whose primary purpose would be to organize the convention. FANdom Con would be multigenre and cover anime, science fiction, and video games. It was estimated that 200-300 people would attend, but the convention instead attracted 752. The first event had a budget of $300 and UWF students entered for free.

FANdom Con moved to the Emerald Coast Convention Center in Fort Walton Beach, Florida starting in 2014 due to growth. Due to low attendance and a website credit card issue, the convention ended 2016 $15,000 below its budget. Due to several issues, the convention suspended operations in 2017.

Event history

References

Defunct multigenre conventions
Recurring events established in 2010
Recurring events disestablished in 2017
2010 establishments in Florida
Annual events in Florida
Conventions in Florida
Festivals in Florida
Tourist attractions in Okaloosa County, Florida
2017 disestablishments in Florida